Ken McArthur (born Kenneth A. McArthur on July, 17th 1950), is an American author, entrepreneur, marketer, event producer, speaker and business consultant.

McArthur developed multiple sites in the top 3,000 Websites on the Internet and produced jvAlert.com which ranked 362 out of all of the Websites on the Internet by the traffic ranking Website Alexa.com

He is perhaps best known for his Impact Action System based on using advanced viral marketing techniques, highly engaged communities, partnerships and collaboration, that teaches people how to create large groups of raving fans for their own ideas with the purpose of making a positive difference in the world and for his joint venture and marketing related events.

In 2009, McArthur's best-selling book, IMPACT: How to Get Noticed Motivate Millions and Make a Difference in a Noisy World, was chosen by PR Channel and listed as the number one choice in its "6 Must-Read Books for Public Relations People" list.

In 2010, McArthur was featured in the Fast Company  Influence Project and listed in the Top-20 Most Influential People Online.

In 2013, the brainchild of Seth Godin, Change This, selected McArthur's manifesto, The Impact Manifesto: You Make A Difference Whether You Want To Or Not, for publication which places it in the company of manifesto's from Seth Godin, Hugh MacLeod, Guy Kawasaki, Chris Anderson, Jay Conrad Levinson, Tom Peters, Malcolm Gladwell and Robert Scoble.

Background
Born in Memphis, Tennessee, McArthur graduated from Delta High School in Delta, Colorado in 1968 and became an entrepreneur with the purchase of a pet store in Lakeland, Florida at the age of 20. McArthur pursued a variety of interests over the 25 years becoming a policeman, recording studio owner, programmer and music teacher.

In 1994 McArthur was selected by Arete, Inc. to become part of a key team of programmers working on forecasting and logistical software for PepsiCo, Inc,  where he was able to develop experience with the power of the Internet at the start of the Dot Com boom.

In 1997, McArthur left the corporate world to found McArthur Business Systems an Internet development organization for McArthur's activities focused on creating massive impact.

Viewpoints
McArthur contends that we all make a difference, whether we want to or not, through the small actions we take every day that impact thousands of lives and through what he calls The Impact Factor which corresponds to what others have called the Ripple Effect or Butterfly Effect.

McArthur believes because we make an impact, we should use the art, science and technologies available to spread positive impact in a leveraged way to impact as many people as possible.

Business Ventures

In 1999, McArthur created the MBS Internet research Center, one of the first online research organizations based on the Internet.

In 2000, McArthur developed a community based portal system called Portalcube which he marketed to non-profit organizations seeking to create highly engaged communities online.

In 2002 he launched Affiliate Showcase.com an affiliate program search engine and directory system based on the Portalcube software which was ranked in the top 3,000 Websites on the Internet by Alexa.com.

In 2003, McArthur created a joint venture alert system called jvAlert.com and on September 15, 2003 it was ranked by Alexa.com as number 362 out of all of the Websites on the Internet and was added to its Movers and Shakers  list of top-ranked Websites.

In 2009, McArthur founded Tobri, LLC and created a social network called Tobri.com that in beta mode reached the top 3,000 sites on the Internet according to Alexa.com

Event Production

From 2005 until 2014, McArthur held a series of live events called jvAlert Live in which he brought together top-level marketers to create joint ventures and learn about the latest marketing techniques.

Speakers included industry leaders: Joel Comm, Mike Filsaime, Ray Edwards, Mark Joyner, Dave Lakhani, James Malinchak, Bob Burg, Willie Crawford, Yanik Silver, and Damian D. Pitts.

In 2011, McArthur began a series of One Day Intensive events around the United States to do small group mentoring and masterminds as well as his Impact Meetups which has grown to over 20 locations world-wide.

In 2013,  McArthur created a continuing series of Impact Factor pod casts about creating massive impact for ideas, products and services and making a real difference in a very noisy world.

In 2014, McArthur started to re-focus his events around his Impact brand and advanced marketing thought leadership.

Speaking

McArthur's speaking engagements included: 
 Affiliate Summit, Philadelphia, PA - 2013
 Canadian Marketing Summit, Vancouver, BC - 2012
 Brendon Burchard's Life's Golden Ticket, Long Beach, CA – 2008

Other Projects

McArthur's Speak Up Save Lives, Teen Suicide Prevention Project highlighted what people could do to help prevent teen suicide by bringing over 150 volunteers, marketing professionals and McArthur's mentoring students together to get a simple message of hope out to over 30 million people in a 30-day period of time.

Bibliography
Impact: How to Get Noticed, Motivate Millions and Make a Difference in a Noisy World,      Career Press, May 1, 2008 
The Impact Factor: How Small Actions Change the World, Action Plan Books, May 2012
The Impact Manifesto: You Make A Difference Whether You Want To Or Not, ChangeThis.org (a brainchild of Seth Godin), August 7, 2013

References

External links
 Official website

1950 births
American businesspeople
Living people
American male writers